The Hillman Coal and Coke Company was a bituminous coal mining company based in Pittsburgh, PA.

The company was formed by John Hartwell Hillman Sr.  He established the Hillman Coal and Coke Company, and J. H. Hillman & Sons, which was eventually run by his three sons. Hillman Coal and Coke Company later became Pittsburgh Coke & Chemical, and it is now Calgon Carbon.

The company built coal patch towns in the following locations:
 Arnold City, PA
 Jerome, PA

Mines

 Alicia Mine, Monvue, PA 
 Edna #1 
 Naomi Mine, Fayette City, PA

See also

References

Coal companies of the United States
Defunct mining companies of the United States
Defunct coal mining companies
Defunct energy companies of the United States